Richard Wilcox (born 13 May 1967 in Würzburg, Germany) is a German and United States diplomat and public finance expert. He served as the Director-General of the African Union’s African Risk Capacity from 2013-2015 at the level of Assistant Secretary General and as Special Advisor on Humanitarian Finance to the United Nations World Food Program. In 2019 he established the Centre for Humanitarian Dialogue cyber conflict mediation practice in Geneva. In 2017, Richard Wilcox co-founded—and is acting president of—Digital Equity, a Swiss association supporting state and non-state actors with their digital transformation whilst controlling the risks of data misuse and privacy encroachment.

Biography 

As a United Nations and African Union diplomat, Wilcox has led key development reform enterprises including the African Risk Capacity (ARC) to ensure African governments against natural disasters  and was first to propose a levy on personal data extraction to finance aid for the elimination of extreme poverty. As head of the ARC, he also developed the first sovereign pandemic insurance program.

In 2008, Wilcox served as the UN Secretary-General's envoy to Serbia for the Kosovo independence process where he negotiated the SG Kosovo package, then the first agreement in the UN Security Council on Kosovo in a decade. He had previously served in UN political and peacekeeping missions in the former Yugoslavia (1995-1999) and Iraq (2003-2004, 2007) as well as Director of United Nations affairs on the US National Security Council (1999-2001).  In 2017, his nomination as UN special envoy to Libya was withdrawn as Russia retaliated against US opposition to an earlier candidate.

Wilcox holds a Ph.D. from MIT (2000) and was a fellow at Harvard’s Olin Institute for Strategic Studies (1998). He has also taught political science at the Johns Hopkins University’s School of Advanced International Studies.

He lives in Rome, Italy with his wife Milena Wilcox, a wine and olive oil sommelier with Slow Food Roma, and son Teo, winner of the 2016 Keats-Shelley House Poetry Prize. Teo also published Freedom: A Short Story of Eastern Europe on Amazon.

Publications 

Joanna Syroka and Richard Wilcox, Rethinking International Disaster Aid Finance, 
Columbia Journal of International Affairs, Vol. 59, No. 2, The Globalization of Disaster (Spring/Summer 2006), pp. 197–214
https://www.jstor.org/stable/24358433?seq=1#page_scan_tab_contents

Richard Wilcox, Data Financing for the Global Good – Afterword, pp. 55–56
https://www.oii.ox.ac.uk/wp-content/uploads/2016/10/Oll-Rockefeller-Data-Financing-for-Global-Good.pdf

References 

1967 births
Living people